The gillbar barb (Enteromius kessleri) is a species of cyprinid fish in the genus Enteromius from Angola and the Democratic Republic of Congo.

References 

 

Enteromius
Cyprinid fish of Africa
Fish described in 1866
Taxa named by Franz Steindachner